The Adivasi Will Not Dance: Stories (New Delhi: Speaking Tiger, 2015) is a collection of short stories. The second book by Hansda Sowvendra Shekhar, it was nominated for The Hindu Literary Prize in 2016 and included by Frontline (magazine) in August 2022 in a list of 25 books “that light up the path to understanding post-Independence Indian literature.”  As of April 2021, this book has been translated into Hindi, Marathi, Tamil, Gujarati, and Bengali, while the Malayalam and Austrian German translations are forthcoming.

Summary 
The characters and settings of the stories are mostly from the community of Santhal people in the Indian state of Jharkhand, particularly in relation to Coal mining in India. Prominent themes include the condition of women in a patriarchal society, poverty, middle-class Santhal life, the situation of Adivasi people, organised crime, tensions between traditionalism and modernity, the social damage caused by mining and sex-work.

Reviews and studies
 Priyanka Tripathi,“The Adivasi Will Not Dance: Stories by Hansda Sowvendra Shekhar.” Rupkatha Journal on Interdisciplinary Studies in Humanities, Vol. IX, No. 4, 2017, pp. 193–196. DOI: https://dx.doi.org/10.21659/rupkatha.v9n4.r02
 Devapriya Roy, 'An unusual five: The reader’s guide to the Hindu Prize shortlist', Scroll.in ([no date])
 Namrata Chaturvedi, 'Combating bias', Deccan Herald (1 November 2015)
 Jean Spraker, 'Review: The Adivasi Will Not Dance by Hansda Sowvendra Shekhar' (27 October 2016)
 Nilanjana S. Roy, 'Short!', Business Standard (4 January 2016)
 Sudipta Datta, 'The Adivasi Will Not Dance: Dark places', Financial Express (27 December 2015)
 Amrita Dutta, 'Book Review: The Writer as Political Being', The Indian Express (19 December 2015)
 Radhika S., 'Review: Hansda Shekhar’s The Adivasi Will Not Dance is a no-holds-barred account of life on the margins', The Hindu (12 November 2016)

The work has also attracted dedicated scholarly commentary:
 Arya, A., 'Dismantling the Hegemonic Structure through the War of Manoeuvre: Hansda Sowvendra Shekhar’s The Adivasi Will Not  Dance as a Dogma of Adivasis', The Creative Launcher: An International, Open Access, Peer-Reviewed, Refereed, E-Journal in English, 2.3 (August 2017), 193–200.
 Abin Chakraborty, 'Examining Subalterneity in Hansda Sowvendra Sekhar’s “The  Adivasi Will Not Dance”', Postcolonial Text 12.1 (2017), 1–15.

Controversy
On 11 August 2017, the government of Jharkhand banned The Adivasi Will Not Dance: Stories and summarily suspended the author from his job, on the grounds that the book portrayed Adivasi women and Santhal culture in a bad light. The key complainants appear to have been the ruling party in Jharkhand, the Bharatiya Janata Party, the opposition party Jharkhand Mukti Morcha, and an academic at Jamia Millia Islamia. The government's actions were widely criticised. The ban on The Adivasi Will Not Dance: Stories was removed in December 2017 and Shekhar's suspension was removed and he was reinstated into his job in 2018.

References

External links
 

Indian short story collections
Adivasi literature
Speaking Tiger books
2015 short story collections